Epirrhoe galiata, the galium carpet, is a moth of the family Geometridae.

Subspecies
Epirrhoe galiata galiata
Epirrhoe galiata orientata (Staudinger, 1901)
Epirrhoe galiata eophanata (Krulikowski, 1906)

Description
The wingspan of Epirrhoe galiata can reach about 28–32 mm. The forewing ground colour is pale grey, with a broad, darker bluish-grey central band. The forewings have also small dark grey or bluish-grey stains near the apex. The hindwings are pale whitish-grey and marked with fine crosslines. The larva is naked except for a few short bristles, brown with dark and light longitudinal stripes.

Biology
There are two generations per year with adults on wing from May to September.

The larvae feed on Galium species, including Galium verum and Galium boreale. Larvae can be found from June/July to September/October. Larva overwinters as a pupa.

Distribution
This species can be found from North Africa and western Europe to the Russian Far East.

Habitat
These moths prefer lime and chalk downland, sunny woodland fringes, dry meadows, grassy heathlands, glades, forest clearings, moorlands, sea-cliffs and xerophilous hillsides.

References

External links

Lepiforum.de

Epirrhoe
Moths of Europe
Moths of Asia
Taxa named by Michael Denis
Taxa named by Ignaz Schiffermüller